Lastman is the surname of the following notable people:
Dale Lastman (born 1957), Canadian legal scholar, son of Mel 
Mel Lastman (born 1933), Canadian businessman and politician
Mel Lastman Square in Toronto, Canada
Nicolaes Lastman (1585–1625), Dutch painter
Pieter Lastman (1583–1633), Dutch painter, brother of Nicolaes

See also
The Last Man (disambiguation)